Frank Callan was a snooker coach, known for his work with world snooker champions Steve Davis and Stephen Hendry.

Biography
Callan, born  1923 was a fish merchant. Having played snooker as a youth, he joined the army in 1940, and did not play the game again until he was 27. He made his first century break when he was 32.

Callan won the Fleetwood and District Amateur Snooker Championship in 1950. It was the first time he had entered the competition. The following year, he lost in the quarter-finals, and in 1952 his quarter-final opponent was awarded a walkover when Callan opted to play in a Fylde championship match scheduled for the same night. In October 1952, receiving 21 points start in each , he lost 1–4 to Joe Davis in a match staged for charity. Callan regained the Fleetwood and District title in 1953, and retained it in 1954. His most notable tournament win was the North West [of England] Amateur Championship.

Callan took an interest in the "mechanics of snooker", and started coaching in the 1970s. His coaching focused on technical aspects, not psychological, and was based around the principle that each player should use a stance that was appropriate for them rather than trying to match an idealised position. Davis's books on technique were highly regarded in snooker circles, but Callan had discussed snooker techniques with him on a number of occasions, and come to believe that Davis's style of play, which was partly due to a weak left eye, would not work for all players. He also recommended using a standard drill (or routine) for each shot.

Callan advised Steve Davis, and was a coach to many players including Terry Griffiths, John Parrott, Allison Fisher, Doug Mountjoy and Stephen Hendry. He was sometimes described in the press as a coach to Steve Davis, but Davis maintained that his own father, Bill Davis, was his coach, and Callan was an adviser. Hendry had worked with Callan, but stopped from the end of the 1997–98 snooker season until February 1999. After winning a record seventh World Snooker Championship in May 1999, Hendry acknowledged Callan's help, saying "I've had help from all kinds of people this season but he is the man for me. He knows my game inside out ... There have been times in matches here where I've not played well but then gone into the interval and Frank has said one thing and it's made all the difference." Mountjoy won the 1988 UK Championship and the 1989 Classic to become the only player apart from Steve Davis to win successive ranking titles, and thanked Callan for his coaching.

Callan died in 2016, aged 93. In 1990, Steve Acteson wrote in The Times that "If the leading players were asked to select the greatest coach in the game, they would invariably nominate Frank Callan." Snooker historian Clive Everton has called Callan "the father of modern coaching".

References

2016 deaths
English snooker players
English sports coaches
1920s births